CJJC-FM is a Christian music radio station that operates at 98.5 FM in Yorkton, Saskatchewan, Canada.

Owned by Dennis M. Dyck, the station was licensed in 2005.

On December 19, 2005, at midnight, the station signed on as 100.5 The Rock and officially began broadcasting on January 2, 2006.

On August 14, 2008, CJJC requested permission to change its frequency to 98.5 FM and increase its power to a 50,000 watt class-B station, citing a financial need to attract a larger potential audience and advertiser base in Yorkton's surrounding area. The request was denied by the CRTC on December 5, 2008. Citing an intervention by Harvard Broadcasting, and a previous denial of a translator station to serve Melville, Saskatchewan, the CRTC argued that CJJC presented insufficient financial justification that it needed a larger advertiser base, as it was "focussed on its desire to expand the existing advertiser base rather than making a case that the existing local advertising base in Yorkton was too small to support the original business plan". However, following a second attempt at the proposal in 2010, the CRTC approved the frequency change and power increase in July 2011, citing that the station had now presented sufficient evidence that it was insufficiently profitable, and would benefit from an expanded signal.

References

External links
98.5 The Rock

Jjc
Jjc
Radio stations established in 2006
2006 establishments in Saskatchewan